Georges-François Hirsch (born 5 October 1944 in the 14th arrondissement of Paris) is a French stage director.

He was co-director of the Paris Opéra (1981–1983), general director of the Théâtre des Champs-Élysées in Paris (1983–1990), then director of the Carcassonne Festival in 1989. He was general administrator of the Opéra Bastille at its opening (1989), then of the entire Paris Opera from 1991 to 1992. He was general director of the Orchestre de Paris from 1996 to 2008.

He also holds various administrative positions: member of the Conseil supérieur de l'audiovisuel from 1993 to 1996, director of music, theatre, dance and entertainment at the French ministry of Culture from 2008 to 2010. 

References

External links 
 Georges-Francois Hirsch on Dirigeant
 Georges-Francois Hirsch on Allgov
 Georges-Francois Hirsch on France Culture
 Georges- François Hirsch: Il nous faut un grand texte fondateur on La Gazette.fr

1944 births
Living people
Theatre directors from Paris
Directors of the Paris Opera